The KP6PA Palmyra Atoll DXpedition was an amateur radio expedition that took place in June and July 1974. The team operated two Yaesu FT-101B transceivers and was able to make approximately 6235 confirmed contacts using morse code and SSB voice.

During the activation of Palmyra Atoll the team helped rescue Duane "Buck" Walker; and his girlfriend, Stephanie Stearn who had run aground on a reef due to an inoperable engine. Due to tensions Walker The expedition was ended a day early and the team left for Kingsman Reef. After the team left Walker murdered Mac and Muff Graham who had anchored at the atoll and would later steal their boat the Sea Wind. Walker would be convicted of murder in 1985 and the book about the Sea Wind murders would become a bestseller.

References 

Amateur radio
Palmyra Atoll
DXpeditions